SH3 and multiple ankyrin repeat domains protein 1 is a protein that in humans is encoded by the SHANK1 gene.

Interactions 

SHANK1 has been shown to interact with:
 ARHGEF7, 
 BAIAP2, 
 DNM2, 
 SPTAN1,  and
 Somatostatin receptor 2.

References

Further reading